Leo Fernandes (born 18 June 1942) is a Kenyan field hockey player. He competed at the 1964 Summer Olympics, the 1968 Summer Olympics and the 1972 Summer Olympics. He is the brother of Kenyan hockey international Hilary Fernandes.

References

External links
 

1942 births
Living people
Kenyan male field hockey players
Olympic field hockey players of Kenya
Field hockey players at the 1964 Summer Olympics
Field hockey players at the 1968 Summer Olympics
Field hockey players at the 1972 Summer Olympics
Field hockey players from Goa
Indian emigrants to Kenya
Kenyan people of Indian descent
Kenyan people of Goan descent
20th-century Kenyan people